IMCB may refer to:

International Medical Commission on Bhopal 
Institute of Molecular and Cell Biology (disambiguation)
Independent Mobile Classification Board, a defunct NGO replaced by the British Board of Film Classification